Gloria Estephan Sáenz (born 2 July 2002) is a Panamanian footballer who plays as a forward for Atlético Nacional and the Panama women's national team.

Career
Sáenz has been capped for the Panama women's national team, making three appearances for the team at the football tournament at the 2019 Pan American Games in Lima, Peru.

See also
 List of Panama women's international footballers

References

External links
 

2002 births
Living people
Panamanian women's footballers
Panama women's international footballers
Women's association football forwards
Footballers at the 2019 Pan American Games
Pan American Games competitors for Panama